The siege of Caudebec was a military event that took place between 24 April to 21 May 1592 as part of the French Wars of Religion and the Anglo-Spanish War (1585–1604).  The Spanish and the French Catholic League forces of Duke of Parma had captured the town of Caudebec on the Seine, where they soon found themselves trapped by the reinforced Royalist Protestant army led by Henry of Navarre consisting of French, English, and Dutch troops. Seeing that Henry's force had now surrounded him, Parma seeing that defeat was inevitable, pulled his 15,000 men across the river in a single night to escape and retreat to the south.

Background
The Catholic forces of the Duke of Parma had relieved Rouen in April 1592 and had skilfully avoided an engagement with Henry's Protestant army. After having entered Rouen Parma then marched west and towards Caudebec on the Seine in the Pays de Caux, a town blocking the road to the important route to the port of Le Havre. Henry's army at the same time had been weakened by disease and desertions to the Catholic League and needed to halt for supplies. Once this had been done Henry was reinforced by the Duke of Montpensier who had just secured Western Normandy with  the capture of Avranches and with this both men were now ready to take to the field again. The army of Henry numbering in all 25,000 men included a large English contingent of 7,000 men, 3,000 Dutch, and included a large cavalry force, nearly all French. In addition the sea lane towards the Seine was operated and controlled by several Dutch warships in support of Henry's forces.

Parma's force took Caudebec with ease and thus set about improving the towns defences.

Siege
Parma desired to keep the Seine open for supplies and for the ferrying of his troops. Henry saw the opportunity in Parma's strategic blunder. This allowed the Spanish forces to be drawn into a narrow triangle between sea and river of which the Dutch ships were present. Henry had obtained control of the Seine both above and below Caudebec holding Pont de l’Arche, the last bridge across the river between Rouen and Caudebec.

On Henry's approach to the town the Catholics forces prepared for a siege, but within a few days with overwhelming numbers the League outerworks were easily overwhelmed leaving the town exposed. During this time Parma received a wound in the arm under the shoulder whilst visiting a gun emplacement; the Duke of Mayenne took over control while Parma convalesced. Every passage was then occupied and strengthened by the King, fierce skirmishes took place everyday, but at length Henry saw all his operations successful, and the army of the League shut in between the river and the sea.

Crucially on the third day Henry's force succeeded in cutting off and forcing the surrender of a leaguer division of light cavalry quartered nearby. A large quantity of baggage, food, plate, and money fell into the hands of the Kings men thus placing a difficult situation for Parma's men already in want of provisions.

Parma was in a hopeless situation - to cross the river was the only means of retreat; and although Mayenne, and the most experienced officers in the army, pronounced it impracticable, Parma resolved to attempt a retreat.

Parma's escape

Parma ordered a redoubt thrown up on the closest margin of the river. On the opposite bank he constructed another and planted artillery with a force of eight hundred Flemish soldiers under the Count of Bossu in the one and an equal number of Walloons in the other. He collected all the flatboats, ferries, and rafts that could be found and at Rouen and then under cover of his forts he transported all the Flemish infantry and the Spanish, French, and Italian cavalry during the night of 22 May to the opposite bank of the Seine. At the same time batteries were erected along the banks to keep off the Dutch fleet. The next morning he sent up all the artillery together with the Flemish cavalry to Rouen making use of what he could of the broken arches of the destroyed bridge in order to shorten the distance from shore to shore. With this he managed to convey his whole army with all its trains across the river. A force was left behind up to the last moment to engage in skirmishes and to display themselves as largely as possible for the purpose of distracting the King's force. The young Prince of Parma Ranuccio I Farnese, Duke of Parma had command of this rearguard and the escape was successful.

The news of this operation was not brought to Henry's attention until after it had been accomplished. When the king reached the shore of the Seine he saw that the rearguard of the army including the garrison of the fort on the right bank were just ferrying themselves across under command of Banuccio. Shocked by this Henry quickly ordered artillery to bear upon the withdrawing soldiers but the bombardment was largely ineffective and the Catholic Spanish force took up their line of march to the south. Henry then constructed a bridge over the Pont de l'Arche and his first objective was to pursue with his cavalry but it was too late; the infantry would not have been able to support them in time.

Aftermath
Parma's withdrawal was complete, but he had to abandon his transport with the sick and wounded. Having escaped from Henry's army, Parma's force then marched eastward at speed reaching Saint Cloud within five days. The Duke afterwards reinforced the garrison in Paris before returning to Flanders.

Even though Henry had been fooled by Parma, the victory did lay with him strategically since Parma had retreated before him and Caudebec was back in the hands of the King. At the same time Henry's opportunity to destroy the Spanish and Catholic army had been missed. Parma had escaped to Flanders but the Spanish court on the view of his retreat meant that he had fallen foul with them and was removed from the position as governor. On 2 December Parma died at Arras, the wound from the battle having proved fatal.

A League and Spanish force defeated an Anglo-Royal army at Craon on 21 May but elsewhere they were less successful. By Winter of that year Henry gave up campaigning but for him at least and the Protestant army Parma was no longer a serious threat. In December Henry disbanded his army but was no closer to recapturing his kingdom.

References 
Citations

Bibliography
 
 
 
 
 
 
 
 

Battles involving France
Battles of the French Wars of Religion
Battles involving Spain
Battles involving England
1592 in France
Conflicts in 1592
Military history of Normandy
History of Seine-Maritime